Mariahilf, the 6th district of Vienna, features together with Alsergrund, the 9th district of Vienna, the steepest topography of the inner districts. There is a 30-meter elevation from Wienfluss to Mariahilfer Straße. Several public staircases have been built:

 Amonstiege, connects Stiegengasse and Windmühlgasse.
 Capistranstiege, connects Capistrangasse and Fillgradergasse.
 Corneliusstiege, connects Corneliusgasse and Gumpendorferstrasse.
 Fillgraderstiege, connects Fillgradergasse and Theobaldgasse.
 Rahlstiege, connects Rahlgasse and Mariahilfer Straße.
 Viktor-Matejka-Stiege, connects Kaunitzgasse with Eggerthgasse and Luftbadgasse.

There is also a staircase in Raimundhof, a passageway connecting Windmühlgasse and Mariahilfer Straße.

References 

Buildings and structures in Mariahilf
Buildings and structures in Vienna
Stairways